W.E. Noffke was an architect in Ottawa, Ontario, Canada, best known for his residential works. His houses, some of the grandest in the city of the time, are designed in a large variety of styles, most in an eclectic style, often with Mediterranean influences. Most of his extant houses are in the Glebe neighbourhood, specifically the Clemow Development. The other major location for his residential buildings includes Sandy Hill with many others in smaller neighbourhoods around the city of Ottawa. Noffke also designed several high-profile Ottawa institutional buildings, including the Central Post Office, Blackburn Building, Hope Building and several embassies. Most of Noffke's projects are located in the greater Ottawa area; however, he has made contributions to communities all across the country. 
This list is a chronological list of selected residential, commercial buildings, government projects and other works by W.E. Noffke.

Table key
 Demolished or destroyed
 Regularly open to the public
 Residential or Private Ownership

Completed works

List of Werner Ernst Noffke works

References

Noffke